Kemere Bridge is a historical bridge in Turkey.

It is over a Black Sea channel connecting two neighborhoods of Amasra. It is between Anatolia mainland and Boztepe Island.
The bridge was constructed in the 9th century, i.e., during the Byzantine Empire era probably together with the  Amasra Castle.

Kemere is a one-arch bridge. Up until recently, the bridge was over a pebble embankment area. After dredging, now the channel has been opened to sea traffic. Currently the abutment of the bridge is being repaired by the governorate of Bartın.

References

Arch bridges in Turkey
Buildings and structures in Bartın Province
Amasra
Stone bridges in Turkey